Acavus haemastoma is a species of air-breathing land snail, terrestrial pulmonate gastropod mollusks in the family Acavidae.

Three subspecies recognized.

Description
Acavus haemastoma has a shell reaching a width of 38–46 mm. These land snails descend to the ground only at night. They feed on rotting fruits. Its shell is rose to dark brown in color, which sometimes white or dark lateral lines can be seen. Body is brown colored.

The species is known to feed on soft tissues of many garden plant fruits, and mosses, lichens as well.

Distribution
This species is endemic to Sri Lanka. It is present in island's rainforest.

Subspecies

Acavus haemastoma fastuosa
Acavus haemastoma haemastoma
Acavus haemastoma melanotragus

References

Acavidae
Gastropods described in 1758
Taxa named by Carl Linnaeus